Hérésie is a double 10" extended play box set by the Irish rock band Virgin Prunes. It was released in November 1982 by L'Invitation Au Suicide, which had commissioned the band to create a work dealing with the concept of insanity. It was released simultaneously with the band's debut studio album, ...If I Die, I Die.

The Hérésie package also contained five booklets. The first 10" disc, consisting of seven songs, functioned as a soundtrack to the booklets. The second disc was a live recording of Virgin Prunes at the Rex Club in Paris in June 1982.

Track listing

Personnel 

Virgin Prunes
 Dave-id Busaras – vocals
 Mary D'Nellon – drums
 Dik Evans – guitar
 Gavin Friday – vocals
 Guggi – vocals
 Strongman – bass guitar

Technical personnel
 James Connolly – assistant engineering (A1-B5)
 Padraig Pearse – engineering (A1-B5)
 Virgin Prunes – production

Release history

References

External links 
 

1982 EPs
Virgin Prunes albums